John Colbridge Wilkinson (born 24 August 1979) is a former footballer and pundit who last played for Tanjong Pagar United FC and the Singapore national team.

Club career
Born in Exeter, Wilkinson played for Exeter City, Woodlands Wellington and Geylang United before joining Singapore Armed Forces in 2006. He won 4 league titles with the club.

After reportedly turning down a three-year deal at SAFFC, Wilkinson joined Police United of Thailand on a two-year contract in January 2012 and became the first foreign captain in the history of the Thai Premier League. However, he failed to see out his contract at the club and signed for reigning Singapore Cup champions Home United at the beginning of the 2012 S-League season. Wilkinson then went to India to sign for Salgaocar in January 2013 until the end of the 2012–13 I-League season. On 6 June 2013, he was unveiled as Tanjong Pagar United's first signing of the mid-season window and wore the number 16 jersey.

International career

Wilkinson became a Singapore citizen after marrying a Singaporean, thus allowing him to play international football for Singapore.

He was called up to the national team (consisted of 32) for a series for friendly matches against North Korea, Saudi Arabia and Australia. He made his debut for Singapore on 24 June 2007 in the second half against North Korea and even got an assist. He scored his first international goal when he broke the deadlock in the 1–1 draw against the United Arab Emirates on 12 September 2007.

He also scored in the 4–0 win over Palestine in a 2010 World Cup qualifying match on 8 October 2007. On 2 June 2008, he scored in a 3–7 home defeat against Uzbekistan in the third round of qualifying.

In total, he scored 4 goals in 29 international games for Singapore.

International goals

After retirement
After retiring, Wilkinson works as a pundit in Singapore for Fox Sports Asia.

Honours
Singapore Armed Forces
S.League: 2006, 2007, 2008, 2009
Singapore Cup: 2007, 2008

References

External links

1979 births
Living people
Sportspeople from Exeter
Footballers from Devon
English footballers
Singaporean footballers
Singapore international footballers
Association football midfielders
Exeter City F.C. players
Tiverton Town F.C. players
Woodlands Wellington FC players
Geylang International FC players
Warriors FC players
John Wilkinson
Home United FC players
Salgaocar FC players
Tanjong Pagar United FC players
English Football League players
Singapore Premier League players
Expatriate footballers in Thailand
English emigrants to Singapore
People who lost British citizenship
Naturalised citizens of Singapore